Abraham ben Judah Eberlen was a sixteenth-century Jewish-German mathematician living in Frankfurt am Main. He was the author of Sefer ha-Ẓifar, a work containing mathematical problems with solutions, which was finished in February 1537.

References

 

16th-century German mathematicians
16th-century German writers
16th-century German male writers
16th-century German Jews
Hebrew-language writers
Scientists from Frankfurt